James Amos Cockerham (August 12, 1910 – December 16, 1963) was an American Negro league catcher in the 1930s.

A native of Magnolia, Mississippi, Cockerham played for the Indianapolis Athletics in 1937. In three recorded games, he posted one hit in five plate appearances. Cockerham died in Indianapolis, Indiana in 1963 at age 53.

References

External links
 and Seamheads

1910 births
1963 deaths
Indianapolis Athletics players
20th-century African-American sportspeople